USA-130 is an American reconnaissance satellite that was launched in 1997. It was a DSP-I block 5 missile detection satellite run by the Defense Support Program. It is currently out of service.

References

Spacecraft launched in 1997
USA satellites
Satellites of the United States Air Force